Estadio Ingeniero Hilario Sánchez is a football stadium in San Juan, Argentina.  It is the home ground of San Martín de San Juan. It has a capacity of 17,000 spectators.

It was renovated in 2007 because San Martín de San Juan was promoted to the first division, and the stadium needed a bigger capacity. The capacity was increased from 11,000 to 17,000, and along with it came a new stand.

Argentina national team matches

References

External links
Stadium Info San Martín official site
Stadium Info Soccerway

Football venues in Argentina
San Martín de San Juan